A raga is a melodic framework in Indian classical music.

Raga or raaga  may also refer to:

Places
 Raga, Arunachal Pradesh, a tehsil in India
 Raga, Bhutan, a town in Bhutan
 Raga, South Sudan, a town in South Sudan

Other uses
 Raga (Buddhism), a Buddhist concept of character affliction or poison
 Rāga, one of three daughters of the Buddhist malignant celestial king Mara
 Raga rock, rock or pop music with a pronounced Indian influence
 Raaga.com, an Indian music streaming service
 Raga (film), a 1971 documentary film
 Raaga (film), a 2017 Indian film
 Raaga (radio station), a Malaysian Tamil-language radio station
 RaGa, nickname of Rahul Gandhi
 Raga language, a language of Vanuatu

See also 
 Ragga, abbreviated term for Raggamuffin music, a subgenre of dancehall music or reggae